The 2003–04 season was Burnley's fourth season in the second tier of English football. They were managed by Stan Ternent in his sixth full season since he replaced Chris Waddle at the beginning 1998–99 campaign.

Season summary
Burnley struggled all season, and finished the season in 19th, two points above the relegation zone. As with the previous season, Burnley's defense was their downfall - the team conceded 77 goals, bettered in the First Division only by bottom club Wimbledon and in the entire Football League by Second Division side Notts County.

Appearances and goals
	
	
	
	
	

	
	

		
	
		

	

|}

Transfers

In

Out

Results

First Division

Final league position

League Cup

First round

Second round

Third round

FA Cup

Third round

Fourth round

Fifth round

References

Burnley F.C. seasons
Burnley